Commonhead (Airdrie North) railway station, was a railway station in Airdrie, Scotland. It was built in 1828, as part of the Ballochney Railway. it was later served after a series of mergers by the North British Railway. The suffix of Airdrie North was not added until 1886. It closed on 1 May 1930.

References

Railway stations in Great Britain closed in 1930
Former North British Railway stations
Railway stations in Great Britain opened in 1828
1828 establishments in Scotland
1930 disestablishments in Scotland